Til is a novel written by the Brazilian writer José de Alencar. It was first published in 1872.

External links 
  Til, the book

1872 Brazilian novels
Novels by José de Alencar

Portuguese-language novels